Florian Luca (born 16 March 1969, in Galați) is a Romanian mathematician who specializes in number theory with emphasis on Diophantine equations, linear recurrences and the distribution of values of arithmetic functions. He has made notable contributions to the proof that irrational automatic numbers are transcendental and the proof of a conjecture of Erdős on the intersection of the Euler Totient function and the sum of divisors function.

Luca graduated with a BS in Mathematics from Alexandru Ioan Cuza University  in Iași (1992), and Ph.D. in Mathematics from the University of Alaska Fairbanks (1996). He has held various appointments at Syracuse University, Bielefeld University, Czech Academy of Sciences, and National Autonomous University of Mexico. Currently he is a research professor at the University of the Witwatersrand.  He has co-authored over 500 papers in mathematics with more than 200 co-authors.

He is a recipient of the award of a 2005 Guggenheim Fellowship for Natural Sciences, Latin America & Caribbean.

Luca is one of the editors-in-chief of INTEGERS: the Electronic Journal of Combinatorial Number Theory and an editor of the Fibonacci Quarterly.

Selected works 
 with Boris Adamczewski, Yann Bugeaud: Sur la complexité des nombres algébriques, Comptes Rendus Mathématique. Académie des Sciences. Paris  339 (1), 11-14, 2013 
 with Kevin Ford, Carl Pomerance: Common values of the arithmetic functions ϕ and σ, Bulletin of the London Mathematical Society 42 (3), 478-488, 2010
 with Jean-Marie De Koninck: Analytic Number Theory: Exploring the Anatomy of Integers, American Mathematical Society, 2012
 Diophantine Equations - Effective Methods for Diophantine Equations, 2009, Online pdf file

References

External links 

1969 births
Living people
Romanian mathematicians
University of Alaska Fairbanks alumni
Syracuse University faculty
Academic staff of Bielefeld University
Academic staff of the National Autonomous University of Mexico
Academic staff of the University of the Witwatersrand
Alexandru Ioan Cuza University alumni
People from Galați